The Fourth Thai–Lao Friendship Bridge is a highway bridge over the Mekong River that links the Chiang Khong District, Chiang Rai Province of Thailand and Houayxay in Laos.  The bridge opened to the public on 11 December 2013.  The bridge was the last section of Asian Highway 3 to be built.

Traffic on the bridge drives on the right, as in Laos, while traffic in Thailand drives on the left; the lane-change is on the Thai side.

Size and location
The bridge is 630 meters long (with a main span of 480 meters) and is 14.7 meters wide.  It is about 10 kilometers from Chiang Khong District in northeastern Chiang Rai Province, in northern Thailand, and about 12 kilometers from Houayxay, the capital of Bokeo Province, northwestern Laos.

North of the bridge, a six kilometer service road connects the bridge to Laotian highway R3A.  In the south, a three kilometer service road connects the bridge to the Chiang Khong-Thoen Highway and Route 1129 in Thailand.

History
The bridge was jointly financed by the governments of Thailand, Laos, and China – with Chinese and Thai construction firms responsible for the construction and the costs shared between Thailand and China. The project was hoped to boost trade and development of the Greater Mekong Subregion.  About 1,900 million baht was budgeted for the project.

On 12 December 2012, a ceremony marking the joining of the two sides of the bridge was held in Houayxay, Laos.  A year later, on 12 December 2013, the bridge was officially opened at a ceremony presided over by Princess Maha Chakri Sirindhorn.

Chiang Khong was designated as a Special Economic Zone in 2015.

See also
 First Thai–Lao Friendship Bridge
 Second Thai–Lao Friendship Bridge
 Third Thai–Lao Friendship Bridge
 Fifth Thai–Lao Friendship Bridge
 Sixth Thai–Lao Friendship Bridge
 Seventh Thai–Lao Friendship Bridge
 Kunming–Bangkok Expressway

References

Thai–Lao Friendship Bridge 04
Thai–Lao Friendship Bridge 04
Thai–Lao Friendship Bridge 04
Thai–Lao Friendship Bridge 04
Thai–Lao Friendship Bridge 04
Thai–Lao Friendship Bridge 04
Thai–Lao Friendship Bridge 04
Thai–Lao Friendship Bridge 04
Articles containing video clips